The 2015–16 Stetson Hatters women's basketball team will represent Stetson University in the 2016–17 NCAA Division I women's basketball season. The Hatters, led by ninth year head coach Lynn Bria, played their home games at Edmunds Center and were members of the Atlantic Sun Conference. They finish the season 26–7, 13–1 in A-Sun play to win the Atlantic Sun regular season title. They advance to the championship game of the 2017 Atlantic Sun women's basketball tournament where they lost to Florida Gulf Coast. They received an automatic bid to the WNIT where they lost to UCF in the first round.

Media
All home games and conference road will be shown on ESPN3 or A-Sun.TV. Non conference road games will typically be available on the opponents website. Audio broadcasts of Hatters games can be found on WSBB AM 1230/1490 with Ryan Rouse on the call.

Roster

Schedule

|-
!colspan=9 style="background:#; color:#FFFFFF;"| Non-conference regular season

|-
!colspan=9 style="background:#; color:#FFFFFF;"| Atlantic Sun regular season

|-
!colspan=9 style="background:#; color:#FFFFFF;"| Atlantic Sun Tournament

|-
!colspan=9 style="background:#; color:#FFFFFF;"| WNIT

Rankings

See also
 2016–17 Stetson Hatters men's basketball team

References

Stetson
Stetson Hatters women's basketball seasons
2017 Women's National Invitation Tournament participants
Stetson Hatters
Stetson Hatters